Elisania Torrico Crespo (born 7 November 1997) is a Bolivian footballer who plays as a forward. She has been a member of the Bolivia women's national team.

International career
Torrico played for Bolivia at senior level in a 0–6 friendly loss to Brazil on 9 April 2017.

References

1997 births
Living people
Women's association football forwards
Bolivian women's footballers
Sportspeople from Cochabamba
Bolivia women's international footballers
Bolivian expatriate footballers
Bolivian expatriate sportspeople in Ecuador
Expatriate women's footballers in Ecuador